The spider genus Cabello consists of only one species, Cabello eugeni, found in Venezuela. It is a small yellow-white spider, with females 2 mm long, and males 1.6 mm. The eye region is reddish with a dusky median longitudinal band, the sternum whitish, with grey sides. The yellow-white legs have scattered black spots on the anterior face. On the abdomen there are scattered white spots.

Name
The genus is named after the city Puerto Cabello in Venezuela. The species is named after Eugène Simon, who collected the first specimen in 1888, on a coffee plantation on the north slope of Mt. Silla.

References

 Levi, Herbert W. (1964). The Spider Genera Stemmops, Chrosiothes, and the New Genus Cabello from America. Psyche 71: 73-92. PDF.

External links

Theridiidae
Monotypic Araneomorphae genera

Invertebrates of Venezuela
Spiders of South America